HMS Triumph was a Royal Navy  light fleet aircraft carrier. She served in the Korean War and later, after reconstruction, as a support ship.

Construction and design
The Colossus class was a class of relatively small aircraft carriers which were designed to be built quickly to meet the Royal Navy's requirements for more carriers to allow it to fight a global war. In order to allow speedy build, they were designed to mercantile rather than navy hull standards, while armour protection and long-range anti aircraft guns were not fitted. Sixteen ships were ordered by the end of 1942, but the last six were completed to a modified design as the Majestic-class.

Four Admiralty 3-drum boilers supplied steam to two sets of Parsons geared steam turbines which in turn drove two propeller shafts.

Two aircraft lifts (each  and with a capacity of  carried aircraft between the hangar and flight deck. Triumph was fitted with a close-in anti-aircraft armament of six quadruple 2-pounder (40 mm) pom-pom autocannon and nineteen single Bofors 40 mm guns. Four 3-pounder (47 mm) saluting guns were also fitted.

Triumph was laid down during World War II on 27 January 1943 at Hawthorn Leslie and Company on the Tyne as Yard number 662.  The relatively simple design meant that construction was relatively rapid, and Triumph was launched by Lady Mountbatten on 2 October 1944. The ship was commissioned into the Royal Navy on 9 May 1946.

Service
On 26 July 1946, Triumph, accompanied by the destroyer , visited the Soviet port of Kronstadt, near Leningrad, taking part in the Navy Day celebrations. In February 1947 she was assigned to the 2nd Aircraft Carrier Squadron, Mediterranean Fleet until August 1948.

Korean War service
In 1950, Triumph was on a cruise to Japan as part of the Far East Fleet. She was nearing Hong Kong when news reached Triumph and her accompanying ships of war breaking out in the Korean peninsula, forcing Triumph into a state of alert, including fully armed aircraft on deck. Triumph, escorted by the destroyer , who would also act as an escort to Triumphs sister ship , was refuelled and re-provisioned at the Royal Australian Naval base at Kure, Japan. The  destroyer  and the cruiser , who would both have prominent roles during the Korean War, as well as the Australian  , and the Royal Fleet Auxiliary tanker , joined Triumph as she left the base.

The following day, she and her escorts, headed for Okinawa, refuelling at the American base there. Then they proceeded to western Korean waters, where other Royal Navy warships were converging. At this time, she was the sole British carrier in the Far East. She was thus destined to have a vital role in the early months of the Korean War. After joining the US Fleet, 827 Naval Air Squadron, part of Triumphs air group, commenced operations with a number of Fireflies in the strike role, with 800 Naval Air Squadron providing fighter cover and secondary strike capability with their Seafires, a naval variant of the Spitfire.
 
The Seafires and Fireflies of Triumph, in conjunction with aircraft from the American carrier , hit airfields at Pyongyang and Haeju on 3 July, the first carrier strikes of the war, with Triumph launching twelve Fireflies and nine Seafires, all armed with rockets, against Heaju. The Seafires, though agile and fast, had an appearance that was a liability when operating with allied forces. The aircraft had a remarkable similarity to the Yak-9, a Second World War Soviet fighter aircraft, in service with the North Korean forces. Such similarities would play to an almost tragic incident further into Triumphs deployment during the Korean War.

On 19 July 1950, Lieutenant P. Cane, flying a Sea Otter, an air-sea rescue aircraft, performed the last operational sea rescue of that type, when a F4U Corsair had been shot down by anti-aircraft fire, forcing the American pilot to ditch into very rough seas. The Sea Otter landed despite the adverse conditions and the American pilot was soon rescued. The Sea Otter returned to Triumph successfully, thanks mainly to the skill of the pilot, who was awarded the US Air Medal as a result.

On 28 July, an almost tragic event occurred, when a flight of Seafires were deployed to an area to investigate possible enemy air activity. They discovered that the activity was a flight of American B-29 bombers. One of the Seafires was hit by one of the bombers in its fuel tank forcing the pilot to bail out and land in terrible sea conditions. Rescue by Sea Otter was impossible due to the appalling conditions. The pilot was forced to wait about an hour until he was rescued by the American destroyer .

Further combat air patrol (CAP) and anti-submarine operations continued until she left Korean waters for Kure in Japan, where she spent her eight days there in refit. Seafires launched numerous photographic reconnaissance operations around areas such as Mokpo, Kunsan, Chinnam, as well as Incheon. Over the next few days, Seafires destroyed two North Korean gunboats, attacked railway tracks, small coaster vessels and oil tanks.

While in harbour the North Koreans launched an unexpected air attack, hitting Comus, causing damage to her hull and killing one sailor in the process. She was escorted to Kure for repair by her sister ship Consort. This caused the carriers to be extra vigilant in the aftermath of the attack, with an increase in CAP operations.

On 29 August, another incident occurred, when a Fairey Firefly landed without an arrestor hook and was stopped by the safety barrier. A large piece of propeller blade broke off, hurtled towards the surface of the flying control position, breaking the glass of the operations room and entering the compartment with tragic consequences, striking Lieutenant Commander I. M. McLachlan, the commanding officer of 800 Naval Air Squadron, who later died from the injuries sustained in this freak incident. He was buried at sea off the coast of South Korea with full naval honours.

On 30 August, after a four-day patrol, Triumph returned to Sasebo, where she received 14 aircraft from the support carrier . On 3 September, Triumph departed Sasebo for the West Coast of Korea. When she got there, her aircraft performed the now routine CAP missions along with reconnaissance duties and bombardment spotting for the  Jamaica and the destroyer .

Operations commenced on the 8th, with Fireflies and Seafires attacking numerous targets, causing much havoc for the North Korean forces.

On the 9th, bad weather forced operations to limit themselves to just eight sorties, with four Fireflies attacking the airfield at Koryo, causing a large amount of damage. 800 NAS's aircraft was decreased yet again, now to just six aircraft, after four others had been written off.  The following day, Triumph returned once again to Sasebo.

Their objective, though unknown to the crews of the ships at that time, was to cover the landings at Incheon. The group, part of CTF 91, a Commonwealth Task Force, was joined by the cruiser  and RAN warship, Bataan, and was now known as the Northern Group. There was also a much smaller Southern Group which comprised the Canadian ships  Athabaskan,  and Sioux.

Triumphs aircraft provided vital air cover for the attacking forces in the first few days before the landings. After the landings took place, Triumph and her accompanying escort, provided anti-submarine patrols, while her aircraft commenced interdiction and spotting operations. Thanks to the spotting by the Fireflies, Jamaica launched a devastating bombardment on North Korean positions, destroying a hidden cache of weapons, which resulted in the top of a hill being obliterated, creating a large plume of smoke that reached 8,000 feet.

The end of the day's operations led to a message to the commander of the Commonwealth naval forces, Admiral Andrewes, from the United Nations' overall commander, General Douglas MacArthur, "My heartiest felicitations on the splendid conduct of the Fleet units under your command. They have added another glamorous page to the long and brilliant histories of the Navies of the British Commonwealth."

By the end of D-Day an astonishing 13,000 troops and all their equipment had been landed. On 17 September, North Korean aircraft bombed the American warship , as well as strafing the British cruiser Jamaica, killing one and wounding two. Shortly afterwards, both warships managed to carry out a brief bombardment of North Korean troops.

On 21 September, Triumph entered Sasebo for the last time in her deployment during the Korean War.

Remainder of service

She carried two terms each of 100 RN and Commonwealth cadets on three cruises each year, in the Spring to the West Indies, in the summer to Scandinavia and around the UK, and in the autumn to the Mediterranean. She carried three Sea Balliol aircraft with which to inculcate air-mindedness in the cadets.

In 1952, Triumph was used for the first trials of an angled flight deck.  Her original deck markings were obliterated and replaced with new ones at an angle to the long axis of the ship.  The success of these trials led to the development of the now-standard design, with additional areas of the flight deck added to the port side of the ship.

In 1954 she was diverted to ferry survivors of the troopship Empire Windrush from North Africa to Gibraltar for repatriation. In 1955 she replaced  on a 'goodwill' visit to Leningrad. This terminated in her captain, Varyl Begg, carrying out a sternboard down the Neva against a beam gale after her hastily laid Soviet sternbuoy had dragged. Her cadet training duties ended with the autumn cruise of 1955, when changes in the system of training RN officers rendered her redundant. Shortly before arriving home to Devonport, Triumph executed the last axial-deck landing in the RN.
 

Triumph was then converted, between 1956 and 1965, into a heavy repair ship, emerging from the work with the pennant number "A108". Triumph was based in Singapore after her conversion, being involved in a major exercise in 1968 in the Far East, with numerous capital ships from the United Kingdom and other nations taking part, as well as dozens of destroyers and frigates. Triumph was used as a heavy repair and transport ship for troops. In 1975 she was placed in reserve at Chatham Dockyard where she was used as a backdrop for the annual Navy Days, and in 1981 she was struck and sold for scrapping in Spain that December. The Ministry of Defence did enquire into the possibility of buying her back following the Falklands Crisis in April 1982 but dismantling was already too far advanced.

Notes

References

External links

 Maritimequest HMS Triumph photo gallery
Britain's Small Wars - HMS Triumph in Korea
"The Forgotten Cruise" HMS Triumph and the 13th Carrier Air Group

 

Colossus-class aircraft carriers
Ships built on the River Tyne
1944 ships
Cold War aircraft carriers of the United Kingdom
Korean War aircraft carriers of the United Kingdom
Auxiliary ships of the Royal Navy